Stanley Robert Larsen (November 11, 1915 – November 1, 2000) was a United States Army lieutenant general who served as commander of I Field Force, Vietnam during the Vietnam War.

Military career
Larsen attended the United States Military Academy at West Point, graduating in 1939. He served in the 35th Infantry Regiment, leading its 2nd Battalion in the Second Battle of Mount Austen during the Guadalcanal Campaign of World War II.

Larsen later commanded the 8th Infantry Division from November 1962 to April 1964, Task Force Alpha (later renamed I Field Force, Vietnam) from 4 August 1965 to July 1967, and the Sixth United States Army until April 1971.

References

1915 births
2000 deaths
People from Honolulu
United States Army personnel of the Vietnam War
United States Army personnel of World War II
United States Army generals
Recipients of the Distinguished Service Cross (United States)
Recipients of the Silver Star
Recipients of the Legion of Merit
United States Military Academy alumni